Lipocosma rosalia is a moth in the family Crambidae. It was described by Maria Alma Solis and David Adamski in 1998. It is found from Mexico south to northern South America.

The length of the forewings is 4.8-6.5 mm. The ground colour of the forewings is lustrous white. The submarginal, postmedial and antemedial lines, as well as the basal patch are yellow. The ground colour of the hindwings is white with yellow submarginal and postmedial lines, as well as a yellow discal spot and wing margin.

Etymology
The species name refers to Santa Rosa National Park, the type locality.

References

Glaphyriinae
Moths described in 1998